Silvana Franco is a British TV personality and chef.

Early life 
Of Italian origin, Franco was raised in Derby. Following chef's training at High Peak College in Buxton, she studied a degree in Home Economics.

Career 
A college work placement with the BBC's Vegetarian Good Food magazine led to a position as a senior writer for Good Food, following which she worked as Food Editor for Marks and Spencer magazine. Her first work in television was with Ainsley Harriott as a food stylist, but she was subsequently promoted to presenter. She starred in the 2002 BBC series The Best. Franco is the author of several cookbooks, including 'Family Food' (2006) and 'The Really Useful Ultimate Student Cookbook' (2007).

Silvana is currently Food Editor at Waitrose & Partners and presents many of their cookery videos including the recent At Home With Us series.

Personal life 
She married Rob Fitzpatrick and has a daughter, Cassia, and a son, Fabio.

References

External links
https://www.silvanafranco.com/
https://www.brookhousekitchen.com/
http://www.bbc.co.uk/food/chefs/silvana_franco
http://uktv.co.uk/food/item/aid/530570
https://web.archive.org/web/20081012105217/http://bbcgoodfood.com/content/knowhow/ourexperts/silvanafranco/

Living people
1968 births